
Gmina Szczytniki is a rural gmina (administrative district) in Kalisz County, Greater Poland Voivodeship, in west-central Poland.

Villages
Gmina Szczytniki contains the villages and settlements of Antonin, Borek, Bronibór, Chojno, Cieszyków, Daniel, Główczyn, Górki, Gorzuchy, Grab, Guzdek, Helenów, Joanka, Kobylarka, Kornelin, Korzekwin, Kościany, Krowica Pusta, Krowica Zawodnia, Krzywda, Kuczewola, Lipka, Mała Gmina, Marchwacz, Marchwacz-Kolonia, Marcjanów, Mroczki Wielkie, Murowaniec, Niemiecka Wieś, Pamiątków, Pieńki, Popów, Poręby, Pośrednik, Radliczyce, Rudunki Szczytnickie, Sobiesęki Drugie, Sobiesęki Pierwsze, Sobiesęki Trzecie, Staw, Strużka, Szczytniki, Trzęsów, Tymieniec, Tymieniec-Dwór, Tymieniec-Jastrząb, Tymieniec-Kąty, Tymieniec-Niwka and Włodzimierz.

Neighbouring gminas
Gmina Szczytniki is bordered by the gminas of Błaszki, Brzeziny, Godziesze Wielkie, Goszczanów, Koźminek and Opatówek.

References
Polish official population figures 2006

Szczytniki
Kalisz County